Best FM is a Hindi-language entertainment radio station in Mauritius that is owned and broadcast by the Mauritius Broadcasting Corporation. The radio started operating on the 5th of October 2010  and is entirely dedicated to Bollywood music and has as slogan "Aur Kya Chahiye" (What better). The radio channel opens as its sister station Taal FM which has been rebranded to a regional radio station, broadcasting shows in 13 popular speaking languages in Mauritius.

Programming
The program Naya Savera runs daily on the radio from 5 am to 7 am. A playlist runs under the title 'Non Stop Music' daily till early morning without any radio jockey. The 9-10 PM slot on weekend are attributed to various different shows.

Monday-Thursday

 Naya Savera (The New Morning)
 Morning Tadka 
 Lifestyle
 Once Upon a time in Bollywood
 Bollywood Buzz
 Raftaar-Rush Hour
 Evening Lounge
 9-10 PM special 
 Campus Time
 The Gramophone
 Sports Scan
 World.com

Friday

 Naya Savera
 Morning Fun
 Love Mix
 Dil Jo Bhi Kahe (What the hearts tell)
 Popcorn
 Weekend Metro 
 Afternoon Energy
 BEST FM House Music

Saturday 

 Music Cafe
 Hot 20
 Spotlight
 Greeting Cards
 Sports & Music
 Dance Machine

Sunday 

 Music Cafe (dedications)
 Dil Ki Yaadein (Memories of Heart)
 Bollywood Club
 Music Room
 Sunday is Out
 Meri Yaar Ki Shaadi Hai (It's my friend's wedding)
 Great Classics

Formerly Broadcast Shows 

 Mast Morning Show
 Day Delights
 Yaadein
 Bombay Dreams
 Rush Hour
 Sunset Manoranjan
 Aap Ki Choice 
 Night Raagas
 Friday Morning Show
 Yaadein
 Bollywood Weekly
 Island Waves
 Sunset Music

See also
List of radio stations in Mauritius

References

External links
 Official Broadcaster Website
 Best FM Website and Live Streaming

Radio stations in Mauritius
Mauritius Broadcasting Corporation